Albert Poli (born Alberto Poli; 21 May 1945 – 6 December 2008) was a professional footballer who played as a midfielder. Born in Italy, he moved to France at the age of two and was later naturalized.

Career 
Poli played as a midfielder. He began his career at amateur club  before signing for Angers in 1965. After nine years with Angers, he signed for Paris Saint-Germain, who had only just been promoted to the Division 1. However, he left the club after one season only. He stopped playing football in 1982 to take the full job of manager at the club.

Personal life and death 
Poli was born in the town of Colzate in Italy. He emigrated to France at the age of two. During the 1974–75 season, during which he played for Paris Saint-Germain, he became a naturalized French citizen, 27 years after initially moving to France.

In 1987, Poli became the manager of Dinan. He simultaneously took a job as a sports instructor in a primary school in the area of Dinan. In 1995, he stopped managing the football club of the town, but continued in his sports coach position until 2003, when he retired. He died on 6 December 2008 due to cancer.

Honours

Player 
Angers
 Division 2: 1968–69

Manager 
Digne
 Division d'Honneur: 1978–79
 Division 4 Group H: 1980–81
 Coupe de Provence: 1983

References

External links 
 
 

1945 births
2008 deaths
Footballers from Lombardy
Italian footballers
French footballers
Italian emigrants to France
Naturalized citizens of France
Association football midfielders
Angers SCO players
Paris Saint-Germain F.C. players
Stade Rennais F.C. players
FC Rouen players
Championnat de France Amateur (1935–1971) players
Ligue 1 players
Ligue 2 players
French Division 4 (1978–1993) players
French Division 3 (1971–1993) players
Deaths from cancer in France